Ty Hardin (born Orison Whipple Hungerford Jr.; January 1, 1930August 3, 2017) was an American actor best known as the star of the 1958 to 1962 ABC/Warner Bros. Western television series Bronco.

Early life
Hardin was born in New York City, but reared in Texas, after his family moved to the capital city of Austin when he was six months old. His father, an acoustical engineer, left the family four years later.

Hardin graduated in 1949 from Lamar High School in Houston. A football scholarship enabled him to attend Blinn College in Brenham, Texas for one year, and then he went to the Dallas Bible Institute for one semester. He served in the United States Army during the Korean War. He was commissioned after attending Officer Candidate School in Fort Monmouth, New Jersey, and he became a pilot of Forward Observer O-1 Bird Dog liaison aircraft. He attained the rank of first lieutenant. After his return from service, he began taking courses at Texas A&M University in College Station on a scholarship under Coach Bear Bryant, for whom he played tight end.

Acting career

Paramount – "Ty Hungerford"

A Paramount Pictures talent scout discovered Hardin while Hardin attended a costume party. He had rented revolvers from Western Costume, a motion picture costume rental company.

By 1957, Hardin acquired the services of agent Henry Willson and made his way to Hollywood, where he was put under contract by Paramount Pictures.

Initially billed as "Ty Hungerford", he made various minor appearances in several Paramount films, such as The Space Children (1958), As Young as We Are (1958) I Married a Monster from Outer Space (1958), The Buccaneer (1958) and Last Train from Gun Hill (1959).

Warner Bros. years – Bronco

Hardin tried to obtain a support role in the 1959 film Rio Bravo that had been promised to singer Ricky Nelson. John Wayne reportedly saw Hardin while visiting a film set at Paramount and was impressed with Hardin's appearance. Wayne introduced him to Howard Hawks and William T. Orr at Warner Bros. Television; they bargained for his seven-year contract and he moved to Warner Bros., who changed his stage surname to "Hardin", reminiscent of the Texas gunfighter John Wesley Hardin.

He attended actors' school at Warner Bros. and landed small parts in various Warner productions.

When Clint Walker walked out on his ABC series Cheyenne in 1958 during a contract dispute with Warner Bros., Hardin got his big break. Warner bought out Hardin's contract from Paramount Studios and installed him into Cheyenne for the remainder of the season, as the country cousin "Bronco Layne".

Walker and Warner Bros. came to terms after the season ended, but Hardin had made such a big hit on the show that Jack L. Warner gave him his own series, Bronco, under the Cheyenne title. Bronco alternated weeks with Sugarfoot, starring Will Hutchins, and Cheyenne for four years. The series ran from 1958 to 1962.

Hardin guest starred on other Warners shows such as Maverick and 77 Sunset Strip.

Warners cast Hardin in some films such as Merrill's Marauders (1962), where he was second billed to Jeff Chandler; The Chapman Report (1962); the spring break film Palm Springs Weekend (1963); PT 109; and Wall of Noise (1963).

International films
When his contract expired, Hardin did Guys and Dolls in stock. He then left Hollywood to seek opportunity overseas as his series aired all over the world. Like many other American actors, Hardin traveled to Europe, where he made several spaghetti Westerns, including Man of the Cursed Valley (1964).

He appeared in the war film Battle of the Bulge (1965) shot in Spain, and the Western Savage Pampas (1966). He had the lead in Death on the Run (1967).

He supported Joan Crawford in Berserk! (1967) and played Captain Reno in Custer of the West (1967) shot in Spain. He had the lead in Ragan (1968) and One Step to Hell (1968).

Riptide
Hardin starred in the 1968–1969 Australian television series Riptide, in which he played an American running a charter boat company along the eastern seaboard of Australia.

He returned to Europe to star in The Last Rampage (1970), Quel maledetto giorno della resa dei conti (1971), and Drummer of Vengeance (1971). He was in a 1970 German television series called On the Trail of Johnny Hilling, Boor and Billy, shown in the former West Germany.

Hardin was in The Last Rebel (1971) Acquasanta Joe (1971), and You're Jinxed, Friend You've Met Sacramento (1972) and a small role in Avanti! (1972).

In 1974 he was arrested in Spain for drug trafficking and spent time in prison.

Later career
Hardin's later appearances included Rooster: Spurs of Death! (1977), Fire (1977), and Image of the Beast (1980) as well as episodes of TV shows such as The Love Boat.

He was in The Zoo Gang (1985) and Red River (1988) and had a late lead in Born Killer (1989).

Hardin could be seen in Bad Jim (1992), and Rescue Me (1992).

Personal life

In 1958, Hardin had his name changed legally from Orison Whipple Hungerford Jr. to Ty Hardin. He ascribed the change to a matter of convenience.

From 1962 to 1966, he was married to the 1961 Miss Universe, German beauty queen Marlene Schmidt, who later worked in the movie industry; they had one daughter. At the time of his death, Hardin lived with his eighth wife, Caroline, in Huntington Beach, California.

Hardin died on August 3, 2017, aged 87.

Arizona Patriots
After difficulties with the Internal Revenue Service, Hardin founded a tax protest movement in Prescott, Arizona. In 1982, the movement became known as the Arizona Patriots. The group first gained public notice by its efforts to clog the Arizona court system lawsuits in the 1980s, a tactic also employed by Posse Comitatus.

Partial filmography

The Space Children (1958) (with Jackie Coogan) as Sentry
As Young as We Are (1958) as Roy Nielson
I Married a Monster from Outer Space (1958) (with Tom Tryon and Gloria Talbott) as Mac Brody
The Buccaneer (1958) as Soldier (uncredited)
Last Train from Gun Hill (1959) (with Kirk Douglas and Anthony Quinn) as Cowboy Loafer (uncredited)
Cheyenne (1961, Episode: "Duel at Judas Basin") as Bronco Layne
Merrill's Marauders (1962) (with Jeff Chandler) as 2nd Lt. Lee Stockton
The Chapman Report (1962) (with Jane Fonda) as Ed Kraski
PT 109 (1963) (with Cliff Robertson as John F. Kennedy) as Ensign Leonard J. Thom
Wall of Noise (1963) (with Suzanne Pleshette and Dorothy Provine) as Joel Tarrant
Palm Springs Weekend (1963) as Doug 'Stretch' Fortune
Man of the Cursed Valley (1964) as Johnny Walscott
Savage Pampas (1965) (with Robert Taylor) as Miguel Carreras
Battle of the Bulge (1965) (with Henry Fonda) as Lt. Schumacher
Death on the Run (1967) as Jason
Custer of the West (1967) (with Robert Shaw) as Maj. Marcus Reno
Berserk! (1967) (with Joan Crawford) as Frank Hawkins
Ragan (1968) as Lee Ragan
King of Africa (1968) as Lt. King Edwards
Rekvijem (1970) as Major
Terrible Day of the Big Gundown (1971) as Jonathan Benton
Drummer of Vengeance (1971) as The Stranger
The Last Rebel (1971) as The Sheriff
Holy Water Joe (1971) as Jeff Donovan
Sei iellato, amico hai incontrato Sacramento (1972) as Jack Thompson 'Sacramento'
Avanti! (1972) as Helicopter Pilot (uncredited)
Arpad - Zwei Teufelskerle räumen auf (1975)
Fire! (1977, TV Movie) as Walt Fleming
Rooster: Spurs of Death! (1977) as The Texan
Image of the Beast (1980) as The Missionary
The Zoo Gang (1985) as Dean Haskell
Born Killer (1989) as Sheriff Stone
Bad Jim (1990) as Tom Jefferd
Rescue Me (1992) as Sheriff Gilbert
Head Over Spurs in Love (2011) as Colonel Sanders (final film role)

References

External links

 
 Ty Hardin at Brian's Drive-In Theater
 Ty Hardin  interview with Joe Krein

1930 births
2017 deaths
Male actors from Texas
Lamar High School (Houston, Texas) alumni
Blinn College alumni
Blinn Buccaneers football players
Texas A&M University alumni
Texas A&M Aggies football players
United States Army officers
United States Army personnel of the Korean War
American Korean War pilots
American male television actors
Male Spaghetti Western actors
Male Western (genre) film actors
Male actors from New York City
Military personnel from Houston
Male actors from Huntington Beach, California
Warner Bros. contract players
Western (genre) television actors